The Trespassers is a 1976 film directed by John Duigan and starring Judy Morris and Briony Behets.

Premise
In 1970, political journalist Richard lives with Penny but is having an affair with actress Dee. The two woman meet and become friends.

Cast
Judy Morris as Dee
Briony Behets as Penny
John Derum as Richard
Hugh Keays-Byrne as Frank
Peter Carmody as Ted
Camilla Nicoll as Jenny
Diana Greentree as Angela
Max Gillies as publisher
Chris Haywood as Sandy
Sydney Conabere as Harry

Production
$70,000 of the budget came from the Australian Film Commission. The film was shot in Melbourne and in south Gippsland in late winter of 1975.

References

External links

The Trespassers at Australian Screen Online
The Trespassers at Oz Movies

Australian drama films
1976 films
Films directed by John Duigan
Films scored by Bruce Smeaton
1970s English-language films
1970s Australian films